V8 Supercars RedLine is a racing simulator based upon Australia's V8 Supercars series. It is an upcharge attraction which allows up to 4 guests to participate in a 24-car race around Bathurst. Located in the southern portion of Ocean Parade, V8 Supercars RedLine forms part of Dreamworld's marketing initiative, Adrenalin Alley which incorporates the FlowRider and AVPX.

History
On 14 November 2008, Dreamworld announced V8 Supercars RedLine on Australian theme park forum, Parkz.

Construction of the ride began shortly after the ride's announcement. An existing shed, originally used as part of the Cyclone's theming, was modified and extended to become the home of V8 Supercars RedLine.

The ride was originally scheduled to open on 16 December 2008, however, a number of reasons forced it to be delayed. V8 Supercars RedLine had a soft opening on 26 December 2008. The ride was officially opened on 18 February 2009 with V8 Supercar drivers Cameron McConville, Craig Lowndes, Greg Murphy and Jamie Whincup present for the launch.

Operation
Guests enter the V8 Supercars RedLine building which is located adjacent to the FlowRider and the Cyclone at the southern end of Ocean Parade. Riders must pre-book their session at the booking counter. When it is their session riders will receive a briefing on how to drive the cars as well as a safety spiel.

During normal park operating hours, drivers are required to pay $10 to experience V8 Supercars RedLine. Guests who don't want to drive but still want to experience the ride can purchase a passenger pass for $5. For these prices they get to experience the ride for 7 minutes.

On selected Friday nights, Dreamworld operate V8 Supercars RedLine as NightDriver. For a $20 fee, drivers can have a 30-minute session. Spectators can watch the session for $5.

Cars
V8 Supercars RedLine originally featured 4 replica V8 Supercars. The cars were modeled on those of Craig Lowndes, Greg Murphy, Mark Winterbottom and Cameron McConville in the 2008 V8 Supercars series, with each car fitted with a collision detection system. This translates into mechanical movements. Screens covering 180° vision surround each of the cars. The cars also feature a rear-vision camera. During its latest renovation, the replica cars were ditched in favour of a modern, top-of-the-line Vesaro motion simulator, with upgrades to a sequential gearbox as well as the display screens. The latest iteration features the supported latest rFactor 2 software, to offer a much more dynamic driving experience compared to the older physics simulator.

References

External links

Amusement rides introduced in 2009
Dreamworld (Australia)
Supercars Championship